CMAC FC, is a football (soccer) club in Kampong Chhnang, Cambodia. It plays in the Metfone C-League, the top division of Cambodian football.

Current squad

References

External links 
 CMAC FC

Football clubs in Cambodia
Sport in Phnom Penh